Curie may refer to:
Curie family, a family of distinguished scientists:

 Jacques Curie (1856–1941), French physicist, Pierre's brother
 Pierre Curie (1859–1906), French physicist and Nobel Prize winner, Marie's husband
 Marie Skłodowska–Curie (1867–1934), Polish-French chemist and physicist, two-time Nobel Prize winner, Pierre's wife
 Irène Joliot-Curie (1897–1956), French physicist and Nobel Prize winner, Pierre and Marie's daughter
 Frédéric Joliot-Curie (1900–1958), French physicist and Nobel Prize winner, Irène's husband
Ève Curie (1904–2007), French-American journalist and pianist, Pierre and Marie's daughter
Henry Richardson Labouisse (1904–1987), American diplomat and director of UNICEF, Ève's husband

Things and ideas named after the Curie family

Scientific concepts, inventions and discoveries 
 Curie (unit) (Ci), unit of radioactivity
 Curie (lunar crater)
 Curie (Martian crater)
 Curie (rocket engine), a liquid-propellant engine designed by Rocket Lab
 Curie temperature, also known as the Curie point
 Curie's law
 Intel Curie, a sub-miniature x86/Quark-based platform for wearable applications
 Curium, a synthetic chemical element with atomic number 96

Institutions
 Curie Institute (Paris)
 Curie Institute (Warsaw)
 Curie Metropolitan High School, a secondary school in Chicago
 Pierre and Marie Curie University, Paris

Military vessels
 French submarine Curie (Q 87), a French submarine in the First World War
 French submarine Curie (P67), a French submarine in the Second World War

CURIE 
 CURIE, a syntax for Compact URIs

See also 
 Currie (disambiguation)
 Curry (disambiguation)
 Cury, a civil parish and village in southwest Cornwall, England